Double Phoenix is an anthology of two fantasy novellas by Edmund Cooper and Roger Lancelyn Green, edited by American writer Lin Carter. It was first published in paperback by Ballantine Books in November 1971 as the thirty-seventh volume of its Ballantine Adult Fantasy series.  It was the sixth anthology assembled by Carter for the series.

Summary
The book collects two fantasy novellas, together with three introductory essays on the works, their authors and the book itself by Carter.

Contents
"About The Firebird and Edmund Cooper: Phoenix Times Two" (Lin Carter)
"About From the World's End and Roger Lancelyn Green" (Lin Carter)
"About Double Phoenix" (Lin Carter)
"From the World's End" (Roger Lancelyn Green)
"The Firebird" (Edmund Cooper)

References

1971 anthologies
Fantasy anthologies
Lin Carter anthologies
Ballantine Books books